Seripha is a genus of moths in the subfamily Arctiinae. The genus was erected by Francis Walker in 1854.

Species
 Seripha coelicolor Walker, 1854
 Seripha plumbiola Hampson, 1909
 Seripha pyrrhocrocis Felder, 1875

References

Lithosiini
Moth genera